Hsu Wei-ling (born 20 October 1994) is a Taiwanese professional golfer. 

Hsu was runner-up at the 2018 Pure Silk-Bahamas LPGA Classic. In May 2021, at the Pure Silk Championship on the River Course at Kingsmill Resort she "achieve[d] her lifelong dream of winning on the LPGA Tour for the first time." She represented Chinese Taipei at the 2020 Summer Olympics.

Professional wins (5)

LPGA Tour wins (1)

Symetra Tour wins (2)
2013 Credit Union Challenge
2014 Self Regional Healthcare Foundation Women's Health Charity Classic

Taiwan LPGA Tour wins (2)
2017 CTBC Ladies Open
2021 Taiwan Mobile Ladies Open

Results in LPGA majors
Results not in chronological order before 2019 or in 2020.

CUT = missed the half-way cut
NT = no tournament
"T" = tied

Team appearances
Professional
International Crown (representing Chinese Taipei): 2018

References

External links

Taiwanese female golfers
LPGA Tour golfers
Olympic golfers of Taiwan
Golfers at the 2020 Summer Olympics
Sportspeople from Taipei
1994 births
Living people